Tatarstan hosted and participated in the Turkvision Song Contest 2014 in Kazan. The song "Atlar çaba", performed by Aydar Suleymanov, was selected as the Tatarstani entry for the contest in a national final.

Background

Tatarstan had previously participated in the inaugural  contest. Aline Şeripcanova represented Tatarstan with the song "Üpkälämim" in Eskişehir, Turkey, placing fourth in the final.

Before Turkvision
Broadcaster Maidan TV organised a national final to select their entry for the contest, with the final on 20 September 2014. Submissions were open between 5 August 2014 and 31 August 2014, and the participating artists were revealed on 3 September 2014. The results were determined solely by jury vote. Only 23 artists were initially revealed, and Aydar Suleymanov was a last-minute addition to the selection.

The jury consisted of five members:
Venus Ganeeva – People's Artist of Russia and Tatarstan
Milyausha Aytuganova – Deputy Director General of TRC New Century
Aidar Faizrakhmanov – People's Artist of the Republic of Tajikistan
Hakan Solater – Director General of magazine Voice of Turkey
Milyausha Tamindarova – Honoured Artist of the Republic of Tajikistan

Artist and song information

Aydar Suleymanov
Aydar Suleymanov (born 15 March 1988 in Zainsk) is a Tatarstani singer. He represented Tatarstan in the Turkvision Song Contest 2014 with the song "Atlar çaba", placing second. In 2018, he was the winner of ethno-pop song contest Under the Same Sun, with the songs "Rayxan" and "İl'çebaka".

"Atlar çaba"
"Atlar çaba" is a song performed by Tatarstani singer Aydar Suleymanov, composed by Elmir Nizamov and with lyrics by Renat Haris. The song represented Tatarstan in the Turkvision Song Contest 2014.

At Turkvision

Semi-final
Tatarstan performed eleventh in the semi-final on 19 November 2014, placing first in a field of 25 countries with 223 points, thus qualifying for the final.

Final
Tatarstan performed fifteenth in the final on 21 November 2014, placing second in a field of 15 countries with 201 points.

Voting
The results were determined solely by jury voting. Each country was represented by one juror who gave each song, with the exception of their own country's song, between 1 and 10 points. The Tatarstani juror was Dina Garipova.

Points awarded to Tatarstan

Points awarded by Tatarstan

Notes and references

Notes

References

Countries in the Turkvision Song Contest 2014
Turkvision
2014